Cecilie Tenfjord-Toftby (born 1970 in Norway) is a Swedish Moderate Party politician. She was member of the Riksdag from 2008 to 2022.

References
Cecilie Tenfjord-Toftby at the Riksdag website

Members of the Riksdag from the Moderate Party
Living people
1970 births
Women members of the Riksdag